The Sum of All Fears is a 2002 tactical shooter video game which is developed by Red Storm Entertainment and published by Ubi Soft. It was released for Microsoft Windows, PlayStation 2 (only released in Europe) and GameCube, based on the Ghost Recon game engine; another version was released for the Game Boy Advance.

The game is based on the 2002 film of the same name. It is a tactical first-person shooter game and is very similar in style to that of the Rainbow Six series of games.

Plot

The game's first two missions take place sometime during the film, in which the FBI Hostage Rescue Team (HRT) works to save hostages in a Charleston, West Virginia television station, and shut down operations from a West Virginian militia calling themselves the "Mountain Men". From the third mission on, John Clark recruits the team to work for the CIA and has the operatives work on seeking out and killing the conspirators behind an incident in Baltimore, Maryland, in which a nuclear bomb has been detonated during an American football game, killing a large number of people.

Gameplay
The Sum of All Fears uses a simplified way of gameplay from the Rainbow Six series. There is no planning phase for missions; instead the player's three-man team executes a pre-planned insertion with other anti-terrorist teams controlled solely by the computer. However, the player is free to deviate from the planned route and select their own path. The player also cannot individually select the equipment each team member carries. Instead, the player chooses from a small selection of pre-defined equipment packages for the entire team. On each mission, the player has control of their two teammates, and can take direct control of either of them at any time. The player can also give a few rudimentary commands to the teammates, such as "wait here", "follow me", and "clear/grenade/flashbang the next room".

Reception

The Sum of All Fears sold 180,000 copies by September 30, 2002. By the end of 2002, its sales had surpassed 400,000 copies, although Ubisoft had projected sales of only 350,000 by March 2003.

The PC and Game Boy Advance versions received "average" reviews, while the GameCube version received "unfavorable" reviews according to video game review aggregator Metacritic.

References

External links 
 
 

2002 video games
Cold War video games
Cooperative video games
Game Boy Advance games
GameCube games
Mobile games
Multiplayer and single-player video games
PlayStation 2 games
Red Storm Entertainment games
Ryanverse
Spy video games
Tactical shooter video games
Terrorism in fiction
Tom Clancy games
Ubisoft games
Video games about police officers
Video games based on films
Video games developed in the United States
Video games scored by Bill Brown
Video games set in 2002
Video games set in Austria
Video games set in Israel
Video games set in Lebanon
Video games set in Los Angeles
Video games set in New Jersey
Video games set in North Carolina
Video games set in Pennsylvania
Video games set in South Africa
Video games set in Virginia
Video games set in West Virginia
Windows games